Sean Michaels (born February 20, 1958) is an American pornographic actor, model, director and trade union leader. In 2002, AVN ranked him 14th on their list of The Top 50 Porn Stars of All Time. Michaels has also been inducted into the AVN, NightMoves, and XRCO Halls of Fame.

Early life
Michaels was born Andre Allen and raised in Brooklyn, New York. He attended Boys and Girls High School, the oldest public high school in Brooklyn. After moving to the West Coast, he worked as a nurse for an urgent care facility in Woodland Hills, Los Angeles. He also did runway and print modeling prior to entering the industry.

Career
Michaels started out in the adult industry as a nude model. Dissatisfied with the portrayal of black men in porn, he began performing in adult films in 1989. He chose his porn name by combining the names from two celebrities he admired: his last name refers to Michael Jordan and "Sean" is a reference to Sean Connery (whom Michaels described in an interview as "a man's man, on and off camera"). Michaels gained recognition after appearing in John Leslie's 1990 film Oh What A Night. In 1996, he started Sean Michaels Productions, which was changed to Sean Michaels International the following year when Anabolic Video began handling its distribution.

In 2003, Michaels was issued a cease and desist order by World Wrestling Entertainment (WWE) on the use of his name due to the similarity it had to WWE wrestler Shawn Michaels.  Michaels name was already registered as a trademark, while Shawn Michaels had not registered his moniker.

Along with Lisa Ann and Nikki Benz, Michaels hosted the XRCO Awards in April 2010. In 2018, he performed in his first bisexual scene for Kick Ass Pictures. In regards to the scene, Michaels commented, "I feel strongly about doing the things you want to do in life. Cuckold fans have been asking me for years to do bi scenes, and I'm happy to be making this move. I believe it's important for people to grow sexually in any way they choose."

Advocacy and impact
In 2016, Michaels was elected President of the Adult Performance Artists Guild, then the Adult Performers Actors Guild (APAG). As President, he announced the APAG would push to raise the legal age to perform in adult films from 18 to 21, commenting that "it's 21 years old to drink, so you should have to be 21 to do porn." In 2018, drawing criticism from APAG members who saw him as reducing his participation in the union, Michaels was replaced in the role by Alana Evans, who said that Michaels had been "blackballed" in the pornographic industry due to his guild participation.

In the May 1997 issue of Vibe magazine, he was called "the preeminent force in interracial erotic entertainment." In her book A Taste for Brown Sugar: Black Women in Pornography, women's studies scholar Mireille Miller-Young notes how Michaels's portrayal of "suave and professional" characters in his films has challenged the stereotyping of black men as "sexual beasts" in pornography and expanded opportunities for black performers. Violet Blue shares a similar sentiment in The Ultimate Guide to Adult Videos, calling Michaels a "major force in changing the face and attitudes of the adult industry towards black performers." Blue concluded by dubbing him "the most famous black man to ever appear in porn."

Select appearances

Awards

1995 AVN Hall of Fame
2002 NightMoves Award – Best Actor (Fan's Choice)
2003 NightMoves Award – Best Director (Fan's Choice)
2007 NightMoves Hall of Fame

References

External links

 
 
 

1958 births
African-American male models
African-American models
American male models
African-American nurses
American nurses
African-American pornographic film actors
American male pornographic film actors
American pornographic film directors
American pornographic film producers
Living people
Male nurses
People from Brooklyn
Pornographic film actors from New York (state)
Boys High School (Brooklyn) alumni
Film directors from New York City
Transgender Erotica Award winners
21st-century African-American people
20th-century African-American people